Percy Yates (3 October 1894 – 24 April 1976) was  a former Australian rules footballer who played with Collingwood in the Victorian Football League (VFL).

Notes

External links 

		
Percy Yates's profile at Collingwood Forever

1894 births
1976 deaths
Australian rules footballers from Bendigo
Collingwood Football Club players